President Hotel can refer to:

Russia
 President Hotel (Moscow)

Ukraine
 President Hotel (Kyiv)

United States
(sorted by state, then city/town)
 President Hotel (Kansas City, Missouri), listed on the National Register of Historic Places (NRHP) in Jackson County, Missouri
 President Hotel (Atlantic City, New Jersey), demolished in 1979 for an cancelled casino redevelopment
 President Hotel, New York City, a hotel on 48th Street
 President Hotel (Mount Vernon, Washington), listed on the NRHP in Skagit County, Washington

Others
 President Hotel (Athens, Greece)
 President Hotel (Macau)
 President Hotel (Aoyama, Tokyo)